Neraudia melastomifolia, known as maaloa in Hawaiian, is a species of flowering plant in the nettle family, Urticaceae, that is endemic to Hawaii. It is threatened by habitat loss.

References

melastomifolia
Endemic flora of Hawaii
Taxonomy articles created by Polbot